El Cartel: The Big Boss is the fourth studio album and eighth overall by Puerto Rican rapper Daddy Yankee. It was released on June 5, 2007, by El Cartel Records through Interscope Records and It is the third installment following El Cartel (1997) and El Cartel II (2001). It explores lyrics and themes ranging from immigration, tabloid rumors, romance, dance and protest against political corruption. The album production persecutes an aggressive sound and was focus on hardcore reggaeton and Latin urban mixed with elements of tropical rhythms, R&B and straight-up hip-hop on a few tracks. The album's theme was to solidified the artist status at the top of Latin music industry and rivals. It features guest appearances Akon, Fergie, Will.i.am, Nicole Scherzinger, Héctor el Father and contains the contributions of producers such as Scott Storch, Luny Tunes, Tainy, and Mr. Collipark.

El Cartel: The Big Boss receive polarized reviews by the critics. While some critics enjoyed the music diversion and praised the production as Yankee's input and charisma as well, others criticized reggaeton's repetitive formula. The album was nominated for Lo Nuestro Award for Urban Album of the Year. Also, it was nominated for Best Latin Urban Album at the 50th Annual Grammy Awards and Best Urban Music Album at the 8th Annual Latin Grammy Awards. Eventually, it won Top Latin Album of the Year and Reggaeton Album of the year at the 2008 Latin Billboard Music Awards. The album was supported by two official singles. The lead single "Impacto" won Lo Nuestro Award for Video of the Year in 2008 and was included at the soundtrack of Grand Theft Auto IV.

El Cartel: The Big Boss was a commercial success. It debut at the top of US Billboard Top Latin Albums and at number nine US Billboard 200, with the highest sales figure for reggaeton album in its first week. It was the best selling Latin album in the United States of 2007, His third consecutive album to do so, following Barrio Fino en Directo in 2006 and Barrio Fino in 2005, that were top sellers in the two previous years. Eventually, it received platinum certification (Latin field) three times by the Recording Industry Association of America (RIAA). Also, it reached the top ten in Mexico, Peru, Ecuador, Venezuela, Dominican Republic, Argentina and Paraguay selling over one million of copies worldwide. In August 2007, Daddy Yankee embarked on the Big Boss Tour to promote the album, his second arena tour in the United States and his first official world tour.

Background and production
Initial plans of the album, according to Yankee himself in summer of 2005, it would feature much of his vintage reggaeton style and that he's been in talks with P. Diddy, the Neptunes, Lil Jon and one of his childhood idols, Dr. Dre, about getting down on the album. However, none of those plans was materialized. Daddy Yankee said that he wanted people to see his style as an MC and return to his hip-hop roots. He collaborated with producers Scott Storch and will.i.am to combine, as he put it, "the force and our creative minds to create a new sound".

Yankee started writing for the album shortly after the last leg of Barrio Fino World Tour ended in June 2006. The recording seasons official started in August 2006, at the Hit Factory In Miami and ended in April 2007 with the recording of the remix of Impacto with Fergie. He also collaborated with Akon on a track called, "Bring It On", a track he considered as a follow-up to his lead single. Another song from the album that is characterized as a "catchy club banger" entitled, "Impacto" was produced by Scott Storch and features The Black Eyed Peas member, Fergie. He also recorded a song with Pussycat Dolls' lead vocalist, Nicole Scherzinger, which he described as a "crazy dancehall, Caribbean song". On the track "Soy Lo Que Soy", Daddy Yankee self-proclaimed himself as the leader of reggaeton when he stated that "the Latin people baptized me as the King of Reggaeton".

Reception

Commercial reception
In the United States, the first week prediction were between 110k-115k. However, The album debuted at number seven on the U.S. Billboard 200 and at number one on the Billboard Top Latin Albums chart, selling 82,000 copies in its first week, making it the highest reggaeton album to sell in its first week. By the end of 2007, the album became the top selling Latin album in the United States with 248,000 copies sold. On March 26, 2009, the album received a Latin album triple platinum certification by the Recording Industry Association of America (RIAA) for shipping 300,000 copies.

In Mexico, the album debut at number five and later received platinum certification for moving 50,000 copies. Also, the album was certified Gold. In Venezuela, the album debut at number 4 on the charts. In Dominican Republic, El Cartel: The Big Boss was named best reggaeton album that year. In Argentina and Ecuador, the album debut at number 4. n Venezuela, it debut and peaked at number 5 at the retail album charts according to Recordland. In Peru, it peaked at number 10 at the retail best selling albums charts. The album also charted in Swerzerland and Spain. In Japan, it debut at number 41 with 4,184 copies sold. As of November 2007, The album sold 800,000 copies worldwide. It hit 900,000 copies in it first 12 months of been released.

Critical reception

El Cartel: The Big Boss received generally favorable reviews. Most of the critics praised the album's production and Yankee's input, while others criticized some creative decisions and the repetitive formula. Allmusic gave the album a positive review and said the album consists of "potential hits". Rhapsody said, "he once again proves himself the reigning king of reggaeton" and proclaimed that "he's also doing more with hip-hop in the mainland idiom than a lot of artists." While, Jon Pareles from The New York Times praised Yankee's charisma, consistensy and hability and stated "Daddy Yankee has grown more earnest. He raps about his street connections, his success, his gratitude to God, his artistic pride and his annoyance with the press". Leisla Cobo form Billboard staff praised the production and mainstream appeal and stated "Above all, this is simply a better-crafted album, at both a songwriting and a production level, than prior efforts".

In a more detailed review, Agustin Gurza from the Los Angeles Times gave the album 3 out 4 stars and wrote a positive review titled "Daddy Yankee knows this best; The rapper, once expected to be a crossover star, mostly stays true to his reggaeton roots". In the review he stated "leaves no doubt that he still has the skill and style that made him stand out from reggaeton's crowded rank-and-file" and about the artist's charisma and talent wrote "leaves no doubt that he still has the skill and style that made him stand out from reggaeton's crowded rank-and-file".

In a more critical review, Andrew Casillas of Stylus Magazine gave a mixed review to the record and compared the album to Daddy Yankee's previous efforts and said, "while the front-loaded standard reggaetón tracks aren't short on hit potential, they're lacking in the sort of charisma that has made Daddy Yankee famous." He then added that "the closing third of the album is quite encouraging. Neil Drumming from Entertainment Weekly, wrote "Here, the steady, dance-floor-quivering rhythms that make reggaeton a club staple are beefed up by hip-hop producers like Scott Storch and will.i.am. The results, nonetheless, are robotic: shrill melodies and beats so rigid and relentless".

Promotion and media appearances 
On April 16, 2007, Yankee revealed plans for his second arena tour in the US with initial plans to expand the tour to Europe and Asia. Following the announcement, presale of the tickets started and fans got a pre-order digital copy of the album on iTunes in a marketing strategy to bundle the sales. In May 2007, MTV Tr3s made the reggaeton star its "Artist of the Month", with interviews, news and special programming across its TV, online and wireless platforms. On the day the album was released, an especial edition was released to Walmart that included an exclusive MTV Tr3s-branded package. It includes a DVD with a Daddy Yankee interview, five performances from his MTV $2 Bill concert.

Following the album release, Daddy Yankee embarked in a series of press conferences and television appearances to promote the album including El Show de Cristina, Don Francisco Presenta and So You Think You Can Dance. However, on June 8, 2007, he was hospitalized due dehydration and exhaustion. For this reason, many public appearances were cancelled for rest of the week.

On August 3, 2007, Yankee performed "Impacto" on The Tonight Show with Jay Leno, one of the few Latin acts to do so at the time. On October 2, 2007, he made a guest appearance on the second episode "The Work of a Business Man" of the TV series Cane where also he performed the track "Who's Your Daddy?". The episode was premiered with a viewership of 9.24 million. On November 8, 2007, he performed "Ella Me Levanto" at the 2007 Latin Grammy Awards ceremony. During the promotion of the album, Daddy Yankee performed at Madison Square Garden. The album was supported by The Big Boss Tour, which started its US leg at the Chicago Allstate Arena on August 31 through October 17, 2007, at the Toyota Center in Houston. Following that, the tour continued in Latin America.

Singles
"Impacto" was released as the lead single from the album on April 12, 2007. Simultaneously, the remix version, featuring Fergie was released as a second single. The videos of the two version were released in the Universal Studios. "Mensaje De Estado" was released as the first promotional recording off the album; a short music video then followed. The third official single, "Ella Me Levanto" was also released. In October 2007 was released the official video. The video was recorded in the Dominican Republic.

Track listing

Credits and personnel

Production
Executive Producer: Raymond Ayala
Musical Producer: Daddy Yankee
Co-Producer: Jose "Gocho" Torres
Creative Director: Carlos R. Pérez
Interscope Team
A&R: Joe "3H" Weinberger, HHH Artists
Marketing: Christian Clancy
Marketing Director: Andrew Flad
Marketing Coordinator: Justin Dreyfuss
Mix Engineer: Dylan "3-D" Dresdow
Production Coordinator: Les Scurry
Publicity: Dennis Dennehy
Video: Randy Sosin/David Saslow
New Media: Ravid Yosef
Legal: Damian Elahi
A&R Coordinator: Archie Schonfeld, HHH Artists
International: Don Robinson

El Cartel Records
Project Manager: Mireddys Gonzalez
Legal & Business Affairs: Edwin Prado
Manager: Nomar Ayala
Project Coordinator: Lorna Robles
Public Relations: Mayna Nevárez
Tour Manager: Milton Gonzalez
Stage Manager: Pedro Jimenez
Elastic People Team
Art Direction/Design: Carlos R. Pérez
Graphic Design: Kiley del Valle
Interactive Designer: Balind Sieber
Project Coordination: Eric Vazquez
Controller: Joanna Egozcue
Photography by: Mateo Garcia
Producer: Alejandro Navia
Stylist: O'Neal McKnight

Charts and certifications

Weekly charts

Sales and certifications

See also
List of number-one Billboard Top Latin Albums of 2007
List of number-one Billboard Latin Rhythm Albums of 2007

References

2007 albums
Daddy Yankee albums
Albums produced by Akon
Albums produced by will.i.am
Albums produced by Just Blaze
Albums produced by Scott Storch
Albums produced by Luny Tunes
Albums produced by Nely